Gastón Martínez may refer to:

 Gastón Martínez (footballer, born 1989), Uruguayan midfielder
 Gastón Martínez (footballer, born 1991), Argentine defender